Crossopriza is a genus of cellar spiders that was first described by Eugène Louis Simon in 1893.

Species
 it contains twenty-four species, found in Africa, Asia, Australia, the Americas, Germany and Micronesia:
Crossopriza dhofar Huber, 2022 – Oman
Crossopriza ghul Huber, 2022 – Oman
Crossopriza ibnsinai Huber, 2022 – Kazakhstan, Uzbekistan, Turkmenistan, Tajikistan, Afghanistan
Crossopriza illizi Huber, 2022 – Algeria
Crossopriza johncloudsleyi Deeleman-Reinhold & van Harten, 2001 – Yemen, Kenya
Crossopriza kandahar Huber, 2022 – Afghanistan
Crossopriza khayyami Huber, 2022 – Turkey, Iraq, Iran, Afghanistan
Crossopriza kittan Huber, 2022 – Oman
Crossopriza lyoni (Blackwall, 1867) – Probably Africa and/or Asia. Introduced to the Americas, Germany, Australia, Micronesia
Crossopriza maculipes (Spassky, 1934) – Iraq, Kazakhstan, Uzbekistan, Turkmenistan, Tajikistan, Afghanistan, Pakistan
Crossopriza malegaon Huber, 2022 – India
Crossopriza manakhah Huber, 2022 – Yemen
Crossopriza miskin Huber, 2022 – Oman
Crossopriza moqal Huber, 2022 – Yemen
Crossopriza parsa Huber, 2022 – Iran
Crossopriza pristina (Simon, 1890) (type) – Sudan, Eritrea, Ethiopia, Yemen
Crossopriza sahtan Huber, 2022 – Oman
Crossopriza sanaa Huber, 2022 – Yemen
Crossopriza semicaudata (O. Pickard-Cambridge, 1876) – Egypt, Chad, Sudan
Crossopriza sengleti Huber, 2022 – Iran
Crossopriza soudanensis Millot, 1941 – Mali, Burkina Faso
Crossopriza srinagar Huber, 2022 – Pakistan, India
Crossopriza surobi Huber, 2022 – Afghanistan
Crossopriza tiwi Huber, 2022 – Oman

See also
 List of Pholcidae species

References

Araneomorphae genera
Pholcidae
Spiders of Africa